Winx Club: The Mystery of the Abyss (Italian: Winx Club - Il mistero degli abissi) is a 2014 Italian computer-animated film based on the television series Winx Club. It is the third film based on the show, following 2007's The Secret of the Lost Kingdom and 2010's Magical Adventure. It was directed and produced by series creator Iginio Straffi, who also co-wrote the film with Giovanni Masi.

After the release of the first Winx Club movie, Iginio Straffi stated that Rainbow was "counting on" making second and third Winx films. In 2010, it was announced that Viacom (the eventual co-owner of Rainbow and owner of Nickelodeon) would provide the resources necessary to produce the film. The Mystery of the Abyss was animated using Autodesk Maya and other programs over a period of two years.

The film takes place after the fifth season of the animated series. It follows the Winx fairies as they work to bring balance back to the Infinite Ocean after the Trix, a trio of witches, team up with a nymph named Politea to find a pearl and destroy the source of the fairies' power. The film's release was timed to coincide with the series' tenth anniversary. The film was first released by 01 Distribution in Italy on 4 September 2014. It was shown in theaters across Europe, while most international releases were televised or direct-to-video.

Plot
The Trix witches return to the Infinite Ocean following Triannus’s defeat in an attempt to harness the power of the Emperor's Throne, their leader Icy failing before they are overpowered by the cursed nymph Politea. Politea reveals that after Darcy and Stormy stole her power while destroying her cursed physical form, Politea used mankind’s pollution to revive herself as a spirit affixed to the Emperor’s Throne. Politea also informs the Trix that the throne will only empower the true emperor, Tritannus, who is the only one who can retrieve the Pearl of the Deep, which allows one to control all the oceans in existence. The witches make a deal with Politea to retrieve the Pearl once they release Tritannus from his prison in the Realm of Oblivion, which is only possible with a ritual that uses a young prince’s life force.

The Trix travel to Gardenia to attack Bloom while she is on a date with her fiancé, Prince Sky. The two manage to hide, but the Trix capture Bloom's pet rabbit, Kiko. The Trix render Sky unconscious after he tries to rescue Kiko. The Trix bring Sky to the Infinite Ocean and tie him to the Emperor's Throne. The Trix and Politea preform the ritual to summon an unconscious Tritannus, the latter instructing the witches not to reveal her involvement while they guide Tritannus along until he served his purpose. After Tritannus regains consciousness and Icy jogs his memory, he learns of the Pearl and explains that its whereabouts are known to a powerful nymph named Omnia. Tritannus and the Trix head towards Omnia's cave to force the nymph to reveal where she hid the Pearl of the Deep.

At Alfea College, Bloom's friends agree to help her journey to the Infinite Ocean to save Sky. They discover that Tritannus has sealed every gateway to the ocean except for the Oblivion Portal. The Winx enter the portal and are led through a dangerous dimension. Bloom wakes up in an empty void, where a dark illusion of herself appears to tell her that she has abandoned Sky. When Bloom eventually realizes that she is inside the Realm of Oblivion, she wakes the other Winx. They break free from the dimension with a convergence spell.

The Winx hurry towards the Emperor's Throne, unable to free a weakened Sky before they are attacked by Politea’s mutant minions. Sky manage to direct the Winx to Omnia, who tells them that the Pearl of the Deep has been hidden in the Coral Barrier. They reach the barrier but the Pearl is taken by the Trix and Tritannus, who traps the Winx within the barrier. The girls escape through a tunnel and hurry back to the throne, where Politea took the Pearl from Triannus after revealing herself. She also betrays the Trix, hypnotizing them and Triannus to attack the Winx.

Sky breaks free from the throne and Bloom's bonded selkie, Serena, snatches the pearl from Politea's hand. She gives the pearl to Bloom, who uses it in a convergence spell to destroy Politea. Later, Omnia uses the pearl's energy to heal Sky. The friends return to Alfea, where Sky wakes up and asks what happened to the Trix and Tritannus. The Winx explain that the Trix have fled, Tritannus is once again banished to the Oblivion, and the pearl is back where it should be. Bloom and Sky share a kiss.

Voice cast

Production
In November 2007, Iginio Straffi stated that Rainbow was "counting on" producing a trilogy of Winx films, and that the movies would be given theatrical releases if the box office response to The Secret of the Lost Kingdom was positive. In 2010, it was announced that Viacom (the eventual co-owner of Rainbow and owner of Nickelodeon) would provide the resources necessary to produce a new Winx Club film along with brand-new seasons of the show.

The Mystery of the Abyss was animated using Autodesk Maya and other programs over a period of two years. Around 400 people worked on the film at the Rainbow CGI studio in Rome. The Rainbow team drew around 112 preparatory sketches to design the 34 three-dimensional sets and 167 character models that were rendered for the production. The completed film contains a total of 113,221 key frames, made up of over 6 million layers. Each animator was able to produce between 0.5 and 5 seconds of animation a day. 70 minutes of music, including four original songs, were recorded for the film.

Reception

Box office
In its opening weekend, Winx Club: The Mystery of the Abyss grossed $972,838 in 328 theaters across Italy, ranking  3 at the box office and averaging $2,966 per venue. The film made $469,301 in its second weekend, finishing seventh, and then $240,575 in its third weekend, finishing tenth. At the end of its run, Box Office Mojo recorded that The Mystery of the Abyss had grossed $5.3 million in eleven territories (including $2.3 million in Italy), against a production budget of €12 million. Box office information for the rest of the 30 territories is unknown. In a 2014 Il Fatto Quotidiano article about the decline of the Italian box office, The Mystery of the Abyss was highlighted as the only currently-playing Italian film which had grossed over a million euros (according to data from box office compiler Cinetel).

Release
Rainbow announced that a third Winx film was in production at the Brand Licensing Europe event in October 2013. A teaser trailer for the film was released to YouTube on April 16, 2014. Its release date was first announced in May 2014, and it was advertised as part of the celebrations marking Winx Clubs tenth anniversary as a brand. The film's title was chosen as part of a promotion on the official Winx Club website, which included a poll that asked fans to vote on one of four potential titles. Iginio Straffi and Joanne Lee, the executive producer, appeared alongside Winx mascots on the red carpet of the 2014 Venice Film Festival to promote the movie.

References

External links

 
 
 

2010s Italian-language films
Italian animated films
Italian animated fantasy films
Italian fantasy adventure films
Winx Club films
Nickelodeon animated films
Animated films based on animated series
2014 films
2014 computer-animated films
Animated films about revenge
Italian films about revenge
Rainbow S.r.l. films
Films directed by Iginio Straffi
Films produced by Iginio Straffi
Films with screenplays by Iginio Straffi
2010s American films